Sheldon Farmhouse is a historic home located at Duanesburg in Schenectady County, New York. It was built about 1795 and is a two-story, five bay, frame residence on a limestone foundation in a vernacular Federal style.  It features a gable roof and interior end chimneys.  Also on the property are two contributing barns.

The property was covered in a 1984 study of Duanesburg historical resources.
It was listed on the National Register of Historic Places in 1984.

References

Houses on the National Register of Historic Places in New York (state)
Houses in Schenectady County, New York
Federal architecture in New York (state)
Houses completed in 1795
National Register of Historic Places in Schenectady County, New York